The Southern League was the top-flight ice hockey league for clubs in the majority of England from 1970. It was formed as the counterpart to the clubs in Scotland and the north of England called the Northern League. In 1978, its southern-based clubs broke away and formed the Inter-City League and the remaining clubs continued as the Southern League, known also as the English League North in 1981-82. A Second or "B" Division and a junior league was also contested in most seasons.

Champions
1970-71: Sussex Senators
1971-72: Sussex Senators
1972-73: Altrincham Aces
1973-74: Streatham Redskins
1974-75: Streatham Redskins
1975-76: Streatham Redskins
1976-77: Streatham Redskins
1977-78: Solihull Barons

Notes
Sussex Senators were coached by ex Paisley player Scot - Joe Conway led the senators on their first season. All games played away as there was no home rink. Brighton was a silver blades rink for figure skating. Players such as Mike O'Brien, Jim Thomson, John Rost and John Baxter played during the two seasons that Senators won the league.

References

Defunct ice hockey leagues in the United Kingdom
Sports leagues established in 1970
1970 establishments in England
1978 disestablishments in England
Southern England